Proguithera is a genus of thread-legged bug in the Emesinae. This genus forms a group with two other genera, Guithera and Lutevula. The relationship between the group is unclear at the moment.

Partial species list

Proguithera drescheri
Proguithera inexpectata

References

Reduviidae
Cimicomorpha genera